Raúl Valdés Rubio (born November 27, 1977) is a Cuban-Dominican former professional baseball pitcher. He played in Major League Baseball (MLB) for the New York Mets, St. Louis Cardinals, New York Yankees, Philadelphia Phillies and Houston Astros and with the Chunichi Dragons in Nippon Professional Baseball (NPB).

Professional career

Chicago Cubs
In 2003, Valdés defected from Cuba, where he was a member of the Cuban National team. He signed with the Chicago Cubs as a non-drafted free agent in 2004, and was assigned to the Cubs farm team of the Dominican Summer League. He posted a 7–2 record with a 0.51 earned run average in 16 games for the Dominican Cubs, holding the opponents to a .127 batting average. He also saw action as an outfielder, batting .241 with 12 doubles and 26 runs batted in in 50 games, and was selected for the DSL Post-Season All-Star.

Valdés opened 2005 with Double-A West Tenn, but was promoted rapidly to Triple-A Iowa on May 9. He went 2–0 in five starts, struck out 18 batters and issued just three walks over 23 innings of work for West Tenn. While in Iowa, he was 6–7 with a save in 25 appearances (17 starts), working six or more innings in six of his starts, ending 5–0 with a 2.15 ERA in those outings.

In 2006, Valdés dropped to 1–3 with a 7.59 ERA in 32 innings for Iowa before being released.

Independent leagues
Valdés joined the independent Can-Am League, going 2–1 with a 5.09 ERA in four games for the Nashua Pride and 7–3 with a 2.81 ERA in 17 games, including 12 starts, for the New Jersey Jackals.

New York Mets
Valdés signed a minor league contract with the New York Mets after the end of the season. He started 2007 with High-A St. Lucie and later was promoted to Double-A Binghamton. He combined for a 0–2 record with a 4.17 ERA and one save in 23 games (one start), before being released.

Since 2008, Valdés has pitched winter baseball for the Gigantes del Cibao of the Dominican League and Navegantes del Magallanes of the Venezuelan League. He represented the Dominican team in the 2010 Caribbean Series, in which he led all pitchers in wins (two) and strikeouts (13) and was selected to the All-Star Team.

Valdés was invited to spring training with the Mets in 2010.  He was sent to the Triple-A Buffalo Bisons to start the season, but was quickly promoted to the major leagues. On May 11, Valdés got his first major league victory in an 8–6 win over the Washington Nationals. On July 6, Valdés was called back as the Mets placed Fernando Tatís on the 15-day disabled list. On August 13, Valdés was optioned to AAA along with Ryota Igarashi to make room for Pat Misch and Francisco Rodríguez. On November 5, Valdés was sent down to Triple-A Buffalo and became a free-agent after refusing the minor league assignment.

St. Louis Cardinals
On November 23, 2010, Valdés signed a minor league contract with an invitation to spring training with the St. Louis Cardinals. Valdés made seven appearances for St. Louis, pitching in 5.1 innings and allowing two earned runs on six hits. He was designated for assignment on August 12, 2011.

New York Yankees
On August 16, Valdés was claimed off waivers by the New York Yankees. On August 18, he was assigned to Triple-A Scranton/Wilkes-Barre Yankees. Valdes declared for free agency on October 11.

Philadelphia Phillies
On November 10, 2011, Valdés signed a minor league contract with an invitation to spring training with the Philadelphia Phillies.  After opening the  season with the AAA Lehigh Valley IronPigs, his contract was purchased by the Phillies on May 11, and he joined the club's 25-man active roster.

Houston Astros
Valdés was claimed off waivers by the Houston Astros on October 2, 2013. He was designated for assignment on March 27, 2014. Valdes had his contract purchased by the Astros on April 17, 2014, and was placed on the club's 25-man roster. He was designated for assignment on May 4, and sent outright to the Triple-A Oklahoma City RedHawks on May 6.

Toronto Blue Jays
Valdés was traded to the Toronto Blue Jays on May 19, 2014, for a player to be named later or cash considerations, and he was assigned to the Triple-A Buffalo Bisons. He elected free agency after the season ended.

Chunichi Dragons
On the December 2, 2014, Valdes signed a $400,000, 1-year deal with the Chunichi Dragons of the NPB.

On 26 September 2017, it was announced that Valdes had been released by the Dragons.

Saraperos de Saltillo
On April 3, 2018, Valdes signed with the Saraperos de Saltillo of the Mexican Baseball League. He was released on July 3, 2018.

Toros de Tijuana
On October 16, 2018, Valdes signed with the Toros de Tijuana of the Mexican League for the 2019 season. On April 30, 2019, during a game against the Saraperos de Saltillo, umpires detected a foreign substance on his left arm, which appeared to be pine tar. He was ejected from the game, and later suspended for 10 games and fined an undisclosed amount for the incident. He was released on November 28, 2019.

See also

List of baseball players who defected from Cuba

References

External links

1977 births
Living people
New York Mets players
St. Louis Cardinals players
New York Yankees players
Philadelphia Phillies players
Houston Astros players
Binghamton Mets players
Iowa Cubs players
Nashua Pride players
New Jersey Jackals players
St. Lucie Mets players
West Tennessee Diamond Jaxx players
Buffalo Bisons (minor league) players
Memphis Redbirds players
Navegantes del Magallanes players
Scranton/Wilkes-Barre Yankees players
Toros de Tijuana players
Toros del Este players
Trenton Thunder players
Lehigh Valley IronPigs players
Oklahoma City RedHawks players
Saraperos de Saltillo players
Major League Baseball players from Cuba
Cuban expatriate baseball players in the United States
Cuban expatriate baseball players in Japan
Chunichi Dragons players
Defecting Cuban baseball players
Baseball players at the 2020 Summer Olympics
Medalists at the 2020 Summer Olympics
Olympic medalists in baseball
Olympic bronze medalists for the Dominican Republic
Olympic baseball players of the Dominican Republic
Dominican Republic expatriate baseball players in the United States
Dominican Republic expatriate baseball players in Japan
Gigantes del Cibao players
Leones del Escogido players
Dominican Republic expatriate baseball players in Mexico
Cuban expatriate baseball players in Mexico
Tomateros de Culiacán players
Vaqueros de la Habana players
Cuban emigrants to the Dominican Republic
Naturalized citizens of the Dominican Republic
Baseball players from Havana